Archeological Site No. 143-57 is a historic site in Chesuncook, Maine that is part of the Penobscot Headwater Lakes Prehistoric Sites. It was added to the National Register on October 31, 1995.

References

		
National Register of Historic Places in Piscataquis County, Maine